Ride is a 1998 American comedy film written and directed by Millicent Shelton.  It stars Malik Yoba, Melissa De Sousa, John Witherspoon, and Fredro Starr.

Plot

New York City film school graduate Leta Evans (De Sousa) has just become the assistant to exotic music video director Bleau Kelly (Downtown Julie Brown). She almost loses the job before her first day's barely even started when Bleau decides budget cuts must be made for her next project. When Leta offers to do the assignment for a smaller fee, Bleau decides to have her escort a group of rappers, singers, and showbiz wannabes to Miami for a music video shoot. The gang, which is kept in line by Poppa (Yoba), gets acquainted on a decaying bus as they travel down the East Coast, encountering barroom fights and other problems en route to the music video gig.

Cast
 Malik Yoba as Poppa
 Melissa De Sousa as Leta Evans
 John Witherspoon as Roscoe
 Fredro Starr as  'Geronimo'
 Kellie Shanygne Williams as Tuesday
 Sticky Fingaz as 'Brotha X'
 Cedric the Entertainer as Bo
 Dartanyan Edmonds as 'Byrd'
 Downtown Julie Brown as Bleau Kelly
 Guy Torry as 'Indigo'
 Idalis DeLeón as Charity
 Julia Garrison as Blacke
 The Lady of Rage as 'Peaches'
 Luther Campbell as Freddy 'Freddy B'
 Rueben Asher as Casper
 Snoop Dogg as Mente

Music 
 

A soundtrack containing hip hop music was released on January 27, 1998, by Tommy Boy Records. It contained five charting singles, "The Worst", "Mourn You Til I Join You", "Callin'", "Jam on It" and "The Weekend".

Reception 

Lael Loewenstein of Variety magazine describes the film as having "a few genuinely funny bits of dialogue and some earnest performances" that offset the predictable storyline. The review predicts the film will be popular with the target young urban audience, but with only slight chances of a crossover or international audience. Loewenstein states that the script treads familiar road-movie territory, but the film itself is "technically well above average", including the effective costume, production design, and lensing. The acting is also judged to be "adequate all around" with a notable cameo from Snoop Dogg. Entertainment Weekly gives the film a grade of D+, calling it a mess and saying any serious issues raised in the film are immediately undercut by toilet humor, and whenever the road trip story gains momentum it is interrupted by cameo appearances. The New York Times calls Ride "a weak, unenergetic vehicle for character, comedy, romance, adventure or music."

References

External links
 
 
 

1998 films
1990s comedy road movies
American comedy road movies
African-American comedy films
Films shot in Jacksonville, Florida
Films shot in Miami
Films shot in New York City
1998 directorial debut films
1998 comedy films
1990s English-language films
1990s American films
Films directed by Millicent Shelton